Bihari diaspora are the people from Bihar who resides outside of India.

Pakistan and Bangladesh

During the partition of India in 1947, many Biharis moved to both West Pakistan and East Pakistan, where they were counted among other Muhajirs and still are in present-day Pakistan. About one million Urdu speakers moved to what was then East Bengal adjacent to their Bihar province in eastern India.

When East Pakistan became the independent state of Bangladesh in December 1971, 83,000 Biharis (58,000 former civil servants and military personnel) wanting to leave being ethnic Urdu-speakers, members of divided families and 25,000 hardship cases were evacuated to Pakistan. By 1974, 108,000 had been transferred to Pakistan (mainly by air); by 1981, about 163,000. The remaining Biharis of East Bengal were left behind and found themselves unwelcomed in both countries. Pakistan did not wish to accept the Biharis left in the newly formed Bangladesh as it saw itself a struggling to manage thousands of Afghan refugees at that time, while Bangladeshis scorned the ethnic Biharis for having supported and sided with the West Pakistan during the war and preferring their native Urdu over the Bengali Language Movement.

With little or no legal negotiation about offering the Biharis Pakistani citizenship or safe conduit back home to their native Bihar in India, the Biharis (called "stranded Pakistanis" by some Bangladeshi politicians) have remained stateless for 33 years. The Office of the United Nations High Commissioner for Refugees (UNHCR) has not addressed the plight of the Biharis. An estimated 600,000 Biharis live in 66 camps in 13 regions across Bangladesh, and an equal number have acquired Bangladeshi citizenship. In 1990, a small number of Biharis were allowed to immigrate to Pakistan.

Pakistan has reiterated that as the successor state of East Pakistan, Bangladesh should accept the Biharis as full citizens. Pakistani politicians and government officials have refused to accept these nearly 300,000 stranded Pakistanis of Bihari origin due to inability to absorb such a large number of immigrants at the moment.

In May 2008, a Bangladeshi court ruled that Biharis who were either minors in 1971 or born after 1971 are Bangladeshi citizens and have the right to vote. As a result of the ruling, an estimated 150,000 of the 300,000 Biharis living in Bangladesh are eligible for Bangladeshi citizenship. Although the court ruling explicitly said that the Biharis are eligible to register to vote in the December 2008 elections, the Election Commission closed its rolls in August 2008 without enrolling them.

Caribbean, Fiji, Mauritius, Myanmar, South Africa and Seychelles

A large number of people from the Bhojpuri speaking regions of Bihar Province of British India travelled to various parts of the world in the 19th century to serve as indentured labours on sugarcane, cocoa, rice, and rubber plantations in the Caribbean, Fiji, Mauritius, Myanmar, Seychelles and Natal, South Africa.

A majority of Indo-Mauritians are Bihari Mauritians, so are a proportion of Indo-Seychellois (second largest, since South Indians form a majority of the country's ethnic Indians) as well as a portion of Indian South Africans (fourth largest subgroup in the country after Gujaratis, Tamils and Telugus). Most of the Mauritian Prime Ministers or Presidents were Indo-Mauritians of Bihari descent. Many Indo-Caribbeans are of Bhojpuri descent or hail from the Awadh region in Uttar Pradesh.

References

Indian diaspora